Jian Sun from the Rensselaer Polytechnic Institute (RPI), Troy, NY was named Fellow of the Institute of Electrical and Electronics Engineers (IEEE) in 2015 for contributions to modeling and control of power electronic circuits and systems.

References

Fellow Members of the IEEE
Living people
Year of birth missing (living people)
Place of birth missing (living people)
Rensselaer Polytechnic Institute faculty